Han Tong-il (born 1941) is a South Korean pianist.

Background
Han was born in Hamheung, South Hamgyong, Korea, an area now part of North Korea. He began learning the piano and musical composition from his father at the age of 4. He fled south during the Korean War, ending up in Seoul. He was a guest on the classic American game show, I've Got a Secret, hosted by Steve Allen. Han's secret was that, as a young child, he was discovered by Staff Sergeant, JJ "Mike" Egan, during the Korean War and General Samuel E. Anderson arranged a tour at the USA bases in Japan where they raised money for the young child.

Musical career
Han left South Korea on 1 June 1954. He went to the USA with General Anderson to attend Juilliard, where his teachers included Rosina Lhévinne. In 1965, at 23, he won the prestigious Leventritt Competition.

Han has performed with many of the finest orchestras around the world, among them the New York Philharmonic, Chicago Symphony, Los Angeles Philharmonic, Cleveland Orchestra, Detroit Symphony, London Philharmonic, Royal Philharmonic, Scottish National Orchestra, Oslo Philharmonic, Monte Carlo Orchestra, Rotterdam Philharmonic, Polish Radio National Orchestra, Budapest Radio Symphony Orchestra, and Russian National Symphony, among many others. The conductors with whom he has collaborated include Bernard Haitink, Herbert Blomstedt, Edo de Waart, Rafael Frühbeck de Burgos, Charles Dutoit, Lukas Foss, Eugen Jochum, Raymond Leppard, Robert Shaw, Stanisław Skrowaczewski, and David Zinman.

Since his return to South Korea, Han has performed throughout his homeland as  a soloist performing with numerous orchestras, among them KBS Symphony Orchestra, Seoul Philharmonic Orchestra, Daegu Philaharmonic Orchestra. As a distinguished chamber musician, Han has been a major participant in the Seoul Spring Festival, as well as collaborating with  highly accomplished young musicians.

Han's several recordings include Chopin's Twenty-Four Preludes, Four Ballades and Four Scherzos, eight Sonatas by Beethoven (including the last five), Sonatas by Schubert and Brahms, and a group of shorter piano works under the title "Music I Love To Play". He also has recorded Sonatas for Cello and Piano by Brahms, and Schumann's Fantasy Pieces with cellist Leslie Parnas.  The CD titled "The Kennedy White House Concert" (the live concert given at the White House) has been released.  In this concert recording Han performed Debussy's "Reflet dans l'eau" and electrifying performance of the Liszt's "Mephisto Waltz". His latest CD released in June 2004 was recorded in Rome.  This includes major works by Schumann, Beethoven, and Brahms.

Academic career
Han went on to teach in the music departments of Indiana University, Illinois State University, University of North Texas and Boston University. He returned to Korea in 2005, where he served first as Dean of the College of Music and then as Chair Professor of Music at University of Ulsan. He has also served as Guest Professor at Elisabeth University of Music in Hiroshima, Japan. In March 2007 he began teaching at Suncheon University, Suncheon, Korea.

References

1941 births
Living people
Boston University faculty
Juilliard School alumni
People from South Hamgyong
Indiana University faculty
Illinois State University faculty
University of North Texas faculty
South Korean educators
South Korean musicians
South Korean pianists
South Korean emigrants to the United States
21st-century pianists